Sutton Park School is an independent co-educational multi-denominational day school located just off Saint Fintan's Road in Sutton at the city side of Howth Head on the Northside of Dublin, Ireland.

History 
Sutton Park School was founded in 1957 as one of the first multi-denominational schools in Ireland. One of the founders was Rosaleen Mills who was an Irish activist and educator. She served here as vice-principal for some years. The original school building is a Georgian House whose previous owners sold on.

Since 2016, it no longer offers Boarding facilities. Sutton Park is an international day school, with students from ages 4 to 19 attending from 22 countries. It is accredited by the Council of International Schools.

Amenities and facilities 
The school is set in a residential area, with the main entrance lying several hundred metres from the coast. The main house is Georgian and houses the Intermediate School (Grades 4 to 6). There are over 40 classrooms in the school in total. The modern block consists of the Junior School building, the language block, and the music block, and connects via a suspended walkway to the Atrium building. The Atrium building houses the English department, the library, a computer room, and the Design & Communications Graphics classroom. Other buildings include the gymnasium/assembly hall, an art room, three science laboratories, and the L-shaped block (which consists of ordinary classrooms). There are four designated computer areas across the school—the library, two computer rooms in the Atrium and Language block respectively, and in the Design & Communications Graphics classroom.
 
Facilities include tennis courts, basketball courts, a large blue Astroturf pitch, a grass pitch, a playground, science labs, a library, a large gymnasium with a theatre stage, and an art room.

School sports include hockey, badminton, tennis, football, basketball, tag rugby, athletics (track and field), martial arts, and spikeball.
Other activities, which can be done after school, include Science Club, Model United Nations, Debating, Creative Writing, and drama.

References

 A guide to Sutton Park by John Davis.

External links

Sutton, Dublin
Private schools in the Republic of Ireland
Boarding schools in Ireland
Educational institutions established in 1957
1957 establishments in Ireland